The 2019–20 Minnesota Golden Gophers men's basketball team represented the University of Minnesota in the 2019–20 NCAA Division I men's basketball season. The Gophers were led by seventh-year head coach Richard Pitino and played their home games at Williams Arena in Minneapolis, Minnesota as members of the Big Ten Conference. They finished the season 15–16, 8–12 in Big Ten play to finish in 12th place. The Gophers defeated Northwestern in the first round of the Big Ten tournament before the tournament was canceled due to the ongoing COVID-19 pandemic. All other postseason tournaments including the NCAA tournament were later canceled effectively ending the season.

Previous season
The Golden Gophers finished the 2018–19 season 22–14, 9–11 in Big Ten play to finish in seventh place. As the No. 7 seed in the Big Ten tournament, they defeated Penn State in the second round. In the quarterfinals, they defeated Purdue for the second time on the season. In the semifinals, they lost to Michigan. The Gophers received a bid to the NCAA tournament as  the No. 10 seed in the East Region. There, they defeated seventh-seeded Louisville in the first round before losing to Michigan State in the second round.

Offseason

Departures

Incoming transfers

Recruiting class

2019 recruiting class

Future recruits

2020–21 team recruits

2021–22 team recruits

Roster

Schedule and results

|-
! colspan=9 style=|Exhibition

|-
! colspan=9 style=|Regular season

|-
! colspan="9" style=|Big Ten tournament

|-
!colspan=9 style=|Remaining Games Canceled

References

2019-20
Minnesota
2019 in sports in Minnesota
2020 in sports in Minnesota